Vesã Gomes Naluak (born 8 Mars 1964, in Cacheu, Guinea Bissau) is an Bissauan lawyer and politician. He was a Deputy to the Assembly of the Republic, President of the Specialized Commission for Internal Administration, Local Government and National Defense.He was the interim President of Party for Social Renewal.

Education 
Vesã Gomes Naluak has a degree in Law from the Faculty of Law of the Kuban State University.

Government posts 
 Minister of Justice
 Minister of Energy and Industry
 Deputy of Assembly of Republic

References 

1964 births
Living people
Kuban State University alumni
Energy ministers of Guinea-Bissau
Industry ministers of Guinea-Bissau
Justice ministers of Guinea-Bissau